Pilane Lokuge Jinadasa  was a Sri Lankan planter and politician. A planter from the Andaradeniya Estate in Deniyaya, he was elected to the Parliament of Ceylon representing the Deniyaya electorate. He was a member of the United National Party.

Jinadasa died before being sworn into office.

References

Sri Lankan planters
Members of the 4th Parliament of Ceylon
United National Party politicians

1960 deaths
Sinhalese politicians